Quintero is a town in Chile.

Quintero may also refer to:

 Quintero (surname), a surname (including a list of people with the name)
Quintero (cigar brand)